The 2018 UCI Para-cycling Road World Championships is the World Championships for road cycling for athletes with a physical disability. The Championships took place in Maniago in Italy from 2 to 5 August 2018.

Medalists

Medal table
25 nations won medals

Participating nations
45 nations

References

External links

UCI Para-cycling Road World Championships
UCI Para-cycling Road World Championships
International cycle races hosted by the Netherlands
UCI